Tan Ruyin (born 17 July 1994) is a Chinese footballer who currently plays for Guangdong Lottery in the Chinese Women's Super League.

International goals

References

External links
 
 

1994 births
Living people
Chinese women's footballers
China women's international footballers
2015 FIFA Women's World Cup players
Footballers at the 2016 Summer Olympics
People from Zhanjiang
Footballers from Zhanjiang
Women's association football midfielders
Olympic footballers of China
2019 FIFA Women's World Cup players
Changchun Zhuoyue players